Giovanni Borgato (10 January 1897 – 1975) was an Italian professional footballer who played as a defender.

He played for 5 seasons for Bologna F.C. 1909, winning the championship in the 1924–25 season.

He made his only appearance for the Italy national football team on 18 April 1926 in a game against Switzerland.

External links
 

1897 births
1975 deaths
Italian footballers
Italy international footballers
Venezia F.C. players
Bologna F.C. 1909 players
ACF Fiorentina players
Association football defenders